Paraclinus monophthalmus, known commonly as the One-eyed blenny, is a species of labrisomid blenny native to the Pacific coast of Central America where they occur in shallow waters with plentiful weed growth from Costa Rica to Panama.  This species can reach a length of  TL.

References

monophthalmus
Fish described in 1861
Taxa named by Albert Günther